Maria Overlander van Purmerland (Amsterdam, 24 June 1603 – 27 January 1678) was a noble from the Dutch Golden Age.

Life
Maria Overlander was the daughter of Volkert Overlander and Geertruid Hooft. Her sister Geertruid Overlander (1609–1634) was married to Cornelis de Graeff. At the age of 27 Maria married Frans Banning Cocq. The couple lived at the house De Dolphijn and resided at their castle Ilpenstein. Jan Vos wrote a poem to Maria. In 1655 she became Lady of the Free and high Fief Purmerland and Ilpendam. Maria owned 87,000 Guilder. Her tomb chapel is located in the Oude Kerk. After her death her nephew Jacob de Graeff and his mother Catharina Hooft, who was also Maria's cousin, inherited the High Lordship of Purmerland and Ilpendam.

Notes

Literature 
 Moelker, H.P., De heerlijkheid Purmerland en Ilpendam (1978 Purmerend), pp. 129–155

	

1603 births
1678 deaths
17th-century Dutch women
Nobility from Amsterdam
Lords of Purmerland and Ilpendam